The ninth season of American Idol premiered on Tuesday, January 12, 2010, and concluded on Wednesday, May 26, 2010, on Fox. Simon Cowell, Randy Jackson, and Kara DioGuardi returned to the judging panel. Ellen DeGeneres joined the panel as a replacement for Paula Abdul after guest judges filled in during the auditions. Idol Gives Back also returned for the season and was held on April 21, 2010, during the top seven results show. The top 24 semi-finals format used in the fourth through seventh seasons also returned this season. Cowell, DioGuardi and DeGeneres all left the show after this season ended, although only Cowell's departure was announced in advance. This was the second season where neither of the final 2 contestants had been in the bottom 2 or 3 prior to the finale, with the first being the seventh season. This was also the third consecutive season a male contestant had won, the longest streak for either gender. It was the first season since the sixth season where a female made it to the finale and was also the first time since the seventh season that both the finalists released a different song as a debut single.

Lee DeWyze, a folk rocker from Mount Prospect, Illinois won the competition, beating the runner-up Crystal Bowersox.

Multiple contestants from this season were signed to record deals, including winner Lee DeWyze, runner-up Crystal Bowersox, finalists Casey James, Michael Lynche, Siobhan Magnus, and semi-finalist John Park.

Judges
After the season began, Paula Abdul did not return to the judging panel, having announced in the beginning of August 2009 that she was leaving the show due to unresolved contract negotiations. Victoria Beckham, Mary J. Blige, Shania Twain, Katy Perry (who would go on to be a regular judge on Idol starting in the sixteenth season), Avril Lavigne, Joe Jonas, Neil Patrick Harris and Kristin Chenoweth were brought in to star as guest judges during the auditions phase. There was no guest judge on day two of the Orlando auditions because day one guest judge Chenoweth was called back to New York City. Therefore, Simon Cowell, Kara DioGuardi and Randy Jackson appeared with only three judges on the audition panel similar to the main panel from the first to the seventh season.

After making the decision to utilize guest judges in Abdul's absence, Fox chairman Peter Rice stated that they would find a permanent fourth judge before the season premiere in January 2010, leading the confirmation on September 9, 2009, by Ellen DeGeneres that she would be joining the show as the new permanent fourth judge for the rounds held at CBS Television City for Hollywood Week and thereafter, onto the live shows.

In addition, Simon Cowell announced shortly before the ninth season began that it would be his last season on American Idol. Cowell left the show to begin preparations for an American version of his singing competition The X-Factor.
Also, DeGeneres announced on July 29, 2010, that she would not return to the judging panel because it was not the right fit for her. DioGuardi would also not return as a judge for the tenth season as announced on September 3, 2010. After her departure, DioGuardi helped and nominated Steven Tyler for a role as a judge on season ten to the show's producers.

Regional auditions
Auditions had begun on June 14 of the previous year, less than a month after previous season's finale. Auditions were held in the following cities:

During this stage guest judges filled in the fourth judging seat. Beckham was the first guest judge, appearing for the Denver and Boston auditions. Blige served as a guest judge for the Atlanta auditions. Jonas filled the guest judging role on the first day of the Dallas auditions and Harris took over the role the following day. Chenoweth served as a guest judge on the first day of the Orlando auditions and Twain judged in Chicago. Lavigne judged on the first day of the Los Angeles auditions and was replaced by Perry the following day.

"Pants on the Ground"
During the Atlanta auditions, 62-year-old activist Larry Platt appeared and performed his original song "Pants on the Ground". The song's lyrics criticize people wearing the hip-hop style of clothing including pants that sag. Well over the age limit of 28, Platt was ineligible to continue. His performance has since become a viral hit, and several celebrities performed the song in the days that followed the original airing of his audition in Atlanta.

Hollywood week
Held at the Kodak Theatre for the second straight year, the first day of Hollywood Week featured the 181 contestants from the auditions round (although only 172 contestants were listed on the American Idol website) singing solo with the option of playing an instrument. Ninety-six contestants advanced. The next round required the contestants to split up into groups and perform. Seventy-one advanced to the final round of Hollywood requiring a solo performance. Forty-six made it to the final round where the judges take contestants one by one and tell them if they made the final twenty-four.

Ellen DeGeneres made her first appearance as a judge (replacing Paula Abdul) at this time.

Semi-finals

Semi-finalists
The first seven were revealed on February 16, 2010 (during the second hour on the episode), and the rest were revealed on the following night's episode.

The semi-final format used through the fourth through seventh seasons was revived for this season. Starting with 12 women and 12 men, the women and men perform on weekly separate shows and on the result shows, each performing a Billboard Hot 100 Hit song, and the bottom two contestants each night are eliminated from the competition. The semi-finals took place over three weeks, meaning that six from each gender will be eliminated over the course of the competition, leaving the other six to form the top 12. The females performed on the first night, followed by the males thereafter (the exception was the Top 20, as the Males performed first instead due to a hospitalization of one contestant, Crystal Bowersox, due to complications from diabetes.

From this point on in the show, this season's exit song, "Leave Right Now" by Will Young, was played over eliminations.

Color key:

Top 24
Kris Allen's rendition of "Let It Be" was made available on iTunes for download, with all proceeds going to Haiti charities.

Top 20

Top 16

Finalists

Lee DeWyze (born April 2, 1986, in Mount Prospect, Illinois, 23 years at the start of the show) is from Mount Prospect, Illinois and auditioned in Chicago, Illinois with Bill Withers' Ain't No Sunshine.  He performed The Fray's "You Found Me" during Hollywood week.  Prior to his appearance on American Idol, he had worked in various jobs, including as a paint salesman and a trading floor clerk at the Chicago Mercantile Exchange.  He also appeared as an actor in a short low-budget film 'Deadscapes: Broken Road.'  When he was 17, he was signed to Wuli Records and had released two CDs – So I'm Told and Slumberland. He was declared the winner on May 26.  He was signed to RCA Records after the competition and released an album Live It Up on November 16, 2010.

Crystal Bowersox (born August 4, 1985, in Elliston, Ohio, 24 years at the time of the show) is from Elliston, Ohio and auditioned in Chicago, Illinois with Erma Franklin's Piece of My Heart.  She auditioned for Idol to try to make a better life for her son.  Her Hollywood performance of Aretha Franklin's "(You Make Me Feel Like) A Natural Woman" impressed the judges and fellow contestants alike.  She had performed as a singer from the age of 10 and moved to Chicago aged 17, frequently working as a busker at train stations there.  She was diagnosed with Type 1 diabetes when she was six, and while on the show, she suffered diabetic complication and was hospitalized which resulted in the Top 20 performance nights for the male and female contestants being switched.  She became the runner-up and was signed to Jive Records.  Her debut album Farmer's Daughter was released on December 14, 2010.

Casey James (born May 31, 1982, in Princeton, Texas, 27 years at the time of the show) is from Fort Worth, Texas and auditioned in Denver, Colorado with John Mayer's "Slow Dancing in a Burning Room". He performed professionally after finishing school, but suffered a serious motorcycle accident when he was 21.  He took his shirt off during audition after prompting from Kara DioGuardi and Randy Jackson, and Kara's interest in him became a recurring joke in the season.  He is an accomplished guitarist and demonstrated his skill with his Hollywood round performance of Ray Charles's "I Don't Need No Doctor" and Top 20 performance of Gavin DeGraw's "I Don't Want to Be." He had never previously watched the show before he auditioned. He was eliminated as a third-place finisher on May 19. He was signed to Sony Music Nashville after the show.

Michael Lynche (born May 31, 1983, 26 years at the time of the show) is from St. Petersburg, Florida auditioned in Orlando, Florida with Todd Duncan' "Unchained Melody".  He worked as personal trainer prior to Idol.  His is married and his daughter was born during Hollywood round, and the unfolding drama of his wife's labor was heavily featured during the Hollywood round where he performed John Mayer's "Waiting on the World to Change".  He was saved by the judges when he became the lowest vote-getter on April 7, 2010, but finally he was eliminated at fourth place on May 12.

Aaron Kelly (born April 2, 1993, in Davenport, Florida, 16 years old at the start of the show) is from Sonestown, Pennsylvania and auditioned in Orlando, Florida as a winner from American Idol Experience at Disney's Hollywood Studios.  His audition song was Miley Cyrus's "The Climb", and performed Sarah McLachlan's "Angel" during the Hollywood rounds but forgot his words. He was adopted by his aunt and uncle at age 5.  He had performed from a young age, and was a finalist on PAX-TV's America's Most Talented Kid at the age of 11.  He was in 2010 the youngest American Idol contestant to reach Top 12. He was eliminated at fifth place on May 5.

Siobhan Magnus (born March 15, 1990, in Barnstable, Massachusetts, 19 years at the start of the show) is from Cape Cod, Massachusetts and auditioned in Boston, Massachusetts with Queen's "Love of My Life".  Before Idol she performed as the lead vocalist of her band, Lunar Valve, and she worked as a glassblower in Hyannis, Massachusetts.  She performed  Stevie Wonder's "Living for the City"  in the Hollywood rounds.  She was noted in the show for her ability to sustain a long high-pitched note.  She was eliminated as sixth-placed finisher on April 28.

Tim Urban (born May 1, 1989, in Tacoma, Washington, 20 years at the time of the show) is from Duncanville, Texas and auditioned in Dallas, Texas with Matt Nathanson's Bulletproof Week.  He performed David Cook's Come Back To Me during the Hollywood round.  He did not qualify initially for the semi-finals but was chosen as a replacement for Chris Golightly who was disqualified for having a prior record deal.  He finished at seventh place on April 21.

Katie Stevens (born December 8, 1992, in Southbury, Connecticut, 17 years at the time of the show) is from Middlebury, Connecticut auditioned in Boston, Massachusetts with Glenn Miller's At Last.  She looked after her Portuguese grandmother who suffered from Alzheimer's disease, and she is fluent in Portuguese.  She performed Jean DuShon's "For Once in My Life" in the Hollywood rounds where Kara DioGuardi considered her a possible season's winner.  She finished eighth place on April 14 in a double elimination, due to judges' save being used the previous week.

Andrew Garcia (born October 8, 1985, in Moreno Valley, California, 24 years at the time of the show) auditioned in  Los Angeles with Maroon 5's "Sunday Morning".  He had a good sized following on YouTube prior to auditioning on Idol.  He impressed the judges with his performance of Paula Abdul's "Straight Up" during the Hollywood rounds, but failed to interest the judges in the later rounds. He was eliminated as joint eighth-place finishers together with Katie Stevens on April 14.

Didi Benami (born October 25, 1986, in New York, 23 years at the time of the show) is from Knoxville, Tennessee and currently resides in Hollywood.  She auditioned in Los Angeles, California with The Beatles' "Hey Jude".  She was inspired to audition by her best friend who died in a traffic accident.  She was notable during the Hollywood rounds for her performance of Kara DioGuardi-penned Katharine McPhee's song "Terrified."  She finished tenth after being eliminated on March 31.

Paige Miles (born September 26, 1985, 24 years at the time of the show) is from Naples, Florida and auditioned in Dallas, Texas.  She was eliminated in eleventh place on March 24, 2010.  She performed Stevie Wonder's "Living for the City" in the Hollywood rounds which she considered her favorite moment prior the semi-final.  Simon Cowell considered her to have the best voice among the girls.

Lacey Brown (born August 13, 1985, 24 years at the time of the show) is from Amarillo, Texas and auditioned in Orlando, Florida with Judy Garland's "Over the Rainbow".  She had previously made it to the Hollywood round in the eighth season of American Idol but lost out to Megan Joy at Top 50. Ryan Seacrest noted that her chilling performance of "What a Wonderful World" by Louie Armstrong had a major part in her advancing into the Top 24.  She was the first finalist to be voted off on March 17.

Finals
There are 11 weeks of finals and 12 contestants compete and one finalist eliminated per week based on the American public's votes, except for one week on the Top 9 where it became a double elimination cumulating to the use of the Judges' Save which first introduced in the previous season.

Color key:

Top 12 – The Rolling Stones

Top 11 – Billboard Number 1 Hits
Teams performed a song which hit a number #1 song in the Billboard. Miley Cyrus served as the guest mentor this week.

Top 10 – R&B/Soul
Usher served as the guest mentor this week.

Top 9 (first week) – Lennon–McCartney Songbook

Top 9 (second week) – Elvis Presley
American Idol last year's runner-up Adam Lambert served as the guest mentor this week.

Top 7 – Inspirational Songs
Alicia Keys served as the mentor for this week.

Top 6 – Shania Twain
Contestants performed songs paying tribute to Shania Twain, who also served as the guest mentor this week.

Top 5 – Frank Sinatra
Harry Connick, Jr. served as the guest mentor this week.

Top 4 – Songs of the Cinema
Each contestant sang one solo and one duet with a fellow contestant. Jamie Foxx served as the guest mentor this week.

Top 3 – Contestant's choice & Judges' choice
Each contestant sang two songs, one chosen by the contestant and another by the judges.

Finale – Contestant's choice, Simon Fuller's choice & winner's single
Each contestant sang three songs, a song of their choice, a song chosen by the mentor Fuller, and one winner's single.

Elimination chart
Color key:

Results night performances

Group songs
Top 24: "American Boy" by Estelle
Top 20: "I Gotta Feeling" by The Black Eyed Peas
Top 16: "Haven't Met You Yet" by Michael Bublé
Top 12: None
Top 11: "Wake Me Up Before You Go-Go" by Wham!
Top 10: None
Top 9 (Part 1): Lennon–McCartney medley ("Here, There and Everywhere" / "Got to Get You into My Life" / "The Fool on the Hill" / "All You Need Is Love" / "She Loves You" / "The End" by The Beatles)
Top 9 (Part 2): Elvis Presley medley ("Teddy Bear" / "Burning Love" / "Return to Sender" / "Viva Las Vegas" by Elvis Presley)
Top 7: "Keeping the Dream Alive" (The song was performed in part of Idol Gives Back by the Top 12)
Top 6: None
Top 5:
 Frank Sinatra medley ("The Lady Is a Tramp" / "It Was a Very Good Year" / "I've Got the World on a String" / "Night and Day" by Frank Sinatra)
 Harry Connick, Jr. medley ("We Are in Love" / "Come by Me" / "Hear Me in the Harmony" by Harry Connick, Jr.)
Top 4: None
Top 3: None
Finale:
Top 12 feat. Alice Cooper: "School's Out" by Alice Cooper
Siobhan Magnus and Aaron Kelly feat. Barry Gibb and Robin Gibb: "How Deep Is Your Love" by Bee Gees
Michael Lynche feat. Michael McDonald: "Takin' It to the Streets" by The Doobie Brothers
Top 6 Girls feat. Christina Aguilera: "Beautiful" / "Fighter"
Top 6 Boys feat. Daryl Hall and John Oates: "I Can't Go for That (No Can Do)", "Maneater", "You Make My Dreams" by Hall & Oates
Crystal Bowersox feat. Alanis Morissette: "Ironic" / "You Oughta Know" by Alanis Morissette
Casey James feat. Bret Michaels: "Every Rose Has Its Thorn" by Poison
Lee DeWyze feat. Chicago: "Does Anybody Really Know What Time It Is?", "If You Leave Me Now" and "25 or 6 to 4" by Chicago
Top 12 feat. Janet Jackson: "Again," "Nothing," and "Nasty" by Janet Jackson
Lee DeWyze and Crystal Bowersox feat. Joe Cocker: "With a Little Help from My Friends" by The Beatles

Results show performances

Controversies

Ethnic voting bias
Since the seventh season, the voting results are seemingly skewed towards white contestants, and critics believe that it was white female viewers who vote only for white male contestants. During top 20 week, all four eliminated contestants were non-white. This season had the fewest non-white finalists. This led to criticism of bias in favor of white contestants.

Chris Golightly
Chris Golightly was originally selected as semi-finalist. According to reports, Golightly was disqualified on February 17, 2010, after already being told he was in the top 24, over an old contract. The contract had expired by the time the top 24 began to tape, but they disqualified him because he was under contract at the time of the tryouts, in violation of Idol rules. He was later replaced by Tim Urban at the last minute of the last part of Hollywood Week. Golightly later appears on a Korean television show called Superstar K, a singing competition similar to the American Idol. In there, he tells that he also used to write songs for Korean singers, such as Jewelry, DBSK and ZE:A.

Semi-final eliminations
The semi-final eliminations of early favorites Alex Lambert, Katelyn Epperly and Lilly Scott before the Top 12 stunned bloggers and viewers. Michael Slezak of Entertainment Weekly stated, "So you'd think by season 9 — during the inconsequential semifinals, no less — it would be easy to brush off the bad judgment of speed-texting tweens, to process the way-too-early exits of Lilly Scott, Katelyn Epperly, and Alex Lambert...and move on...(S)o why do the ritual killings of the dreams of (three) indisputably flawed semifinalists feel like they’re part of something bigger, a shifting of the tectonic plates at the core of the Idol universe?"

Ryan Seacrest's Twitter post
Lacey Brown's elimination stirred up controversy after Ryan Seacrest tweeted the results before the elimination aired on the west coast. This caused anger among the fans of the show and as a result, the elimination show may have had lower ratings than usual.

Criticisms of Ryan Seacrest
Seacrest has been criticized by The Wrap and MSNBC Entertainment contributors for "critiquing the judges’ comments" and becoming more aggressive. Ratings for this season have dropped significantly compared to the prior two seasons leading to speculation that its run as the number one show on television may be coming to a close. Reasons for the decline have ranged from the smaller role and pending departure of Simon Cowell to the more unpredictable behavior of Ryan Seacrest.

It was also claimed that Crystal Bowersox had considered Ryan Seacrest to have betrayed her.  After it was reported that she had doubts about staying on in the show but Ryan Seacrest had talked her out of it, her fellow contestant Katelyn Epperly revealed that Crystal texted: "I'm fine...betrayed by Seacrest!" in a text message to her.  Crystal denied that she was planning to leave, and there was no evidence that Ryan Seacrest had leaked the information himself.

U.S. Nielsen ratings 
This season of American Idol was the top show for the 2009–10 season of broadcast primetime shows.  Its Tuesday and Wednesday episodes occupied the top two spots of the season. Viewership for the Tuesday episodes averaged 22.974 million, while the Wednesday episodes averaged 21.951 million.

See also
 American Idols LIVE! Tour 2010

Notes

References

External links

American Idol seasons
2010 American television seasons